"We Connect" is a song recorded by American singer Stacey Q for her debut studio album Better Than Heaven (1986). Written by Willie Wilcox and produced by Jon St. James and Wilcox, the song was the follow-up to her hit single "Two of Hearts".

Track listing and formats 
US 7-inch vinyl single
 "We Connect" (Dance Radio Edit) – 3:42
 "Don't Break My Heart" (LP Version) – 3:33

US 12-inch vinyl single
 "We Connect" (European Mix) – 7:30
 "We Connect" (Dance Radio Edit) – 5:05
 "We Connect" (Instrumental/Safari Mix) – 5:25

Credits and personnel 
Stacey Q – vocals
Jon St. James – producer, keyboards
Willie Wilcox – songwriter, producer, programming
SSQ – music
Skip Hahn – keyboards
Karl Moet – drums, programming
Rich West – keyboards
Rusty Anderson – guitars
Aaron Rapoport – photography

Credits adapted from the single's liner notes.

Charts 
"We Connect" matched its predecessor's top position on the US Dance/Electronic Singles Sales chart but was less successful in pop charts, peaking at number 35 on the Billboard Hot 100 and number 14 on the Dance Club Songs. "We Connect" was released as a single in several territories where "Two of Hearts" had been a hit with impact evident only in Australia, where "We Connect" matched the number seven peak of "Two of Hearts".

Weekly charts

Year-end charts

Popular culture
"We Connect" was promoted on the TV series The Facts of Life in the episode "A Star is Torn", in which Stacey Q portrayed the role of Cinnamon.

References 

1986 singles
1987 singles
1986 songs
Stacey Q songs